The Nationalist People's Coalition (NPC) is a conservative political party in the Philippines, founded in 1992 by then-presidential candidate Eduardo Cojuangco Jr.

History

The Party was founded in 1992 after some members of the Nacionalista Party led by then Rizal Governor Isidro Rodriguez bolted from the party after some disagreements with party leader and then-Vice President Salvador Laurel in preparation for the 1992 presidential elections.  Members of the civil society including the business sector who called themselves "Friends of Danding" invited business tycoon Eduardo "Danding" Cojuangco, a former associate of the long-term authoritarian president Ferdinand Marcos, to run as president and Senator Joseph Estrada as vice president. Cojuangco lost the presidential race, finishing third while Estrada won the Vice Presidency by a landslide.

NPC was a member of the Laban ng Makabayang Masang Pilipino (LAMMP), the political vehicle of then Vice President Joseph Estrada in the 1998 presidential elections.

NPC left the now-defunct LAMMP after Estrada was removed from power in January 2001.  When Gloria Macapagal Arroyo assumed the Presidency, her People Power Coalition, led by the Lakas–CMD party, became the dominant group in Congress. The 75-member Lakas party led the "Sunshine Coalition," which also included the 61-member Nationalist People's Coalition, some members of the Liberal Party, and several other minor parties. The LDP party led the 20-member opposition bloc.

In 2004, the LDP and NPC both backed businessman Eduardo "Danding" Cojuangco as a potential presidential candidate in the 2004 elections. Cojuangco, the NPC chair, was fielded as NPC's standard-bearer, but withdrew.

Results for the 2004 elections show that NPC had 0 seats for the Senate while for the House of Representatives, NPC had 53 seats.

In Background Note: Philippines, under Government and Political Relations, the U.S. Department of State writes: "Members of the Congress tend to have weak party loyalties and change party affiliation easily. There is no clear majority in the Senate, which changed its President in 2006."

1995 Senatorial slate
The NPC formed a full 12-man Senatorial slate for the May 8, 1995, Midterm Legislative and Local elections, as it became a full-fledged opposition party against the administration of President Fidel V. Ramos. They ran against the administration-backed Lakas-Laban Coalition.

Results
The party only got 3 out of 12 possible seats in the Senate, namely: (in order of votes received)

 Miriam Defensor-Santiago
 Gregorio Honasan
 Anna Dominique Coseteng

Present day

On May 14, 2007 election, the party won 26 seats.

Members
 Mark Cojuangco
 Faustino Dy Jr. – former governor of Isabela. 
 Giorgidi B. Aggabao – NPC President
 Michael John Duavit – Former Representative From Rizal NPC Executive Vice President
 Mark Mendoza – NPC Secretary General
 Arthur Y. Pingoy Jr. – Former Representative and Governor of South Cotabato
 Vicente Sotto III, Senator From Quezon City . NPC Chairman
 Ace Durano, Former Tourism Secretary and Former Representative of Cebu Former NPC spokesperson
 Avelino Razon Jr., Former Philippine National Police chief and former presidential adviser on the peace process
 Anthony Golez, Representative from Bacolod and Former deputy presidential spokesperson.
 Ernesto Maceda – Former Senate President, president emeritus of NPC
 Estelito Mendoza – Marcos Lawyer
 Darlene Antonino-Custodio – Former representative of South Cotabato, Mayor of General Santos, deputy minority leader
 Daisy Avance-Fuentes –  Representative and Former Governor of South Cotabato
 Atty. Sixto Brillantes, NPC General Counsel, lawyer of Loren Legarda, chairman of the Commission on Elections
 Loren Legarda – Senator
 Anna Dominique Coseteng – Former senator
 Sherwin T. Gatchalian – Mayor and former representative of Valenzuela City
 Francis Nepomuceno – Former mayor of Angeles City and former representative of Pampanga
 Vic Amante, Mayor of San Pablo City
 Evelio Leonardia, Former mayor and incumbent representative of Bacolod
 Joan V. Alarilla, Mayor of Meycauayan City
 Angelito Gatlabayan, Representative, 2nd District of Antipolo, Former Mayor of Antipolo
 Luis Asistio, Former representative of Caloocan
 Ding Roman, Former Governor of Bataan.
 Enrique Murphy Cojuangco, Congressman of Tarlac
 Claude Bautista, Governor of Davao del Sur
 Emmanuel "Manny" Piñol, former Governor of North Cotabato
 Pedro Acharon, Representative of South Cotabato, Former Mayor Of General Santos
 Juan Ponce "Jack" Enrile Jr., representative from Cagayan  (also with the United Nationalist Alliance)
 Eleanor Bulut-Begtang, Representative of Apayao, Former municipal mayor of Calanasan, Apayao
 Arnulfo P. Fuentebella, Former Speaker of the Philippine House of Representatives, Former Representative of Partido Camarines Sur
 Crisanto S. Rances, Former Vice Governor of Camarines Sur
 Felix William B. Fuentebella, Representative of Partido Camarines Sur
 Elizabeth "Tita Beth" A. Delarmente, Councilor of Quezon City District 1
 Francis "Chiz" Escudero – Former Senator and former representative of the first district of Sorsogon and Governor of Sorsogon; former NPC spokesperson
 Tom P. Bongalonta, Jr., incumbent Mayor of Pili, Camarines Sur

Notable former members
Conrado M. Estrella, III — (became a Party-List Representative of Abono in 2010) Former Representative of Pangasinan's 6th District
 Gilbert Teodoro, Defense Secretary and former Tarlac representative (Moved to Lakas-Kampi-CMD), then to PRP)
 Toby Tiangco – Mayor of Navotas  (Moved to PMP, then to UNA)
 Arturo Tolentino – Former Senator.
 Joey Medina – Mayor of Pateros  (Moved to Nacionalista)
 Richard Gomez – actor (Moved to LP, then to PDP–Laban)
 Mary Ann Susano, Representative of Quezon City (Moved to PMP)
 Teresa Aquino-Oreta, Former Senator and Former Representative of Malabon-Navotas Lone district.
 Cresencia "Donya" Tesoro, incumbent Mayor of San Manuel, Tarlac (moved to Partido Federal ng Pilipinas), but moved again to NPC

As the build-up to the 2010 presidential elections progresses, there are talks that Escudero has been given the nod of the party leaders as its standard-bearer, with Legarda being his running-mate, although the latter said that she won't settle for any other position than the presidency.  Escudero further stressed that he will not entertain any possible alliance with the Arroyo administration forces, thus beleaguering the NPC's status as one of the coalition partners of the Arroyo administration, as he is hell-bent in transforming the supposedly largely pro-administration NPC into an opposition party.

However, all these will remain in the backseat as Escudero announced his sudden resignation from the party, and at the same time asked the public for more time to decide on whether he would pursue his thrice-postponed presidential bid.

Candidates for Philippine general elections, 2010
Loren Legarda – Vice presidential candidate  (guest candidate from Nacionalista Party and LDP) (lost)
Senatorial slate (3)
Miriam Defensor Santiago (Running under the PRP and guest candidate of Lakas Kampi CMD, LDP, Nacionalista Party and PMP) (won)
Rodolfo Plaza (Guest Candidate from PMP) (lost)
Tito Sotto (won)

Candidates for Philippine general elections, 2013
Senatorial slate (2)
Loren Legarda – Guest Candidate from Liberal Party (Philippines)/Team PNoy (won)
Jack Enrile – Guest Candidate from Pwersa ng Masang Pilipino/United Nationalist Alliance (lost)
Edward Hagedorn – Running as independent (lost)

Candidates for Philippine general elections, 2016
President (endorsed): Grace Poe (lost)
Vice President (endorsed): Francis Escudero (lost)

Senatorial slate
Win Gatchalian (won)
Tito Sotto (won)

Candidates for Philippine general elections, 2019
Senatorial slate
Jinggoy Estrada (guest candidate, lost)
JV Ejercito (lost)
Lito Lapid (won)
Imee Marcos (guest candidate, won)
Grace Poe (guest candidate, won)
Bong Revilla (guest candidate, won)

Candidates for Philippine general elections, 2022
Vice Presidential Candidate
Tito Sotto
Senatorial slate
Herbert Bautista (lost)
Win Gatchalian (won)
Loren Legarda (won)
Francis Escudero (won)
JV Ejercito (won)

Electoral performance

Presidential and vice presidential elections

Legislative elections

Current composition
Current members of NPC in the 18th Congress:

Senate
Tito Sotto
Win Gatchalian
Lito Lapid

House of Representatives

District Representatives

 Tyrone Agabas
 Genaro Alvarez
 Erico Aristotle Aumentado
 Lorna Bautista-Bandigan
 Gabriel Bordado
 Elias Bulut, Jr.
 Luis Campos, Jr.
 Solomon Chungalao
 Carlos Cojuangco
 Faustino Michael Dy III
 Ian Paul Dy
 Michael John Duavit
 Mark Enverga
 Sandra Eriguel
 Evelina Guevarra-Escudero
 Bayani Fernando
 Arnie Fuentebella
 Weslie Gatchalian
 Greg Gasataya
 J. Veronique Lacson-Noel
 Loren Legarda
 Dahlia Ambayec-Loyola
 Manuel Luis Lopez
 Bernardita Ramos
 Strike Revilla
 Xavier Jesus Romualdo
 Roman Romulo
 Manuel Sagarbarria
 Angelina "Helen" Tan
 Sharee Ann Tan
 Arnulfo Teves, Jr.
 Gerardo Valmayor
 Noel Villanueva
 Victor Yap

Partylist Allied
 Claudine Diana Bautista (Dumper PTDA)
 Conrado Estrella III (ABONO)
 Florencio Noel (An Waray)

References

External links

Conservative parties in the Philippines
Nationalist parties in Asia
Political parties established in 1991
1991 establishments in the Philippines
Social conservative parties